Robert "Bobby" Thomson (born 21 November 1939) is a Scottish former  footballer who played as a defender. He played first played for Partick Thistle, joining Liverpool in December 1965 for £7,000. He made just six league appearances before joining Luton Town in August 1965 and later emigrated to Australia.

References

External links
 LFC History profile

1939 births
Living people
Sportspeople from Clackmannanshire
Scottish footballers
Association football fullbacks
Sauchie F.C. players
Partick Thistle F.C. players
Liverpool F.C. players
Luton Town F.C. players
Scottish Football League players
English Football League players